Yehoshua Glazer (29 December 1927 – 29 December 2018) was an Israeli footballer who played for Maccabi Tel Aviv and for the Israel national football team his entire career.

Honours
Israeli Premier League (6):
1946–47, 1949–50, 1951–52, 1953–54, 1955–56, 1957–58
Israel State Cup (6):
1946, 1947, 1954, 1955, 1958, 1959

External links
 National team stats

1927 births
2018 deaths
Israeli Jews
Israeli footballers
Israel international footballers
Maccabi Tel Aviv F.C. players
Hapoel Kfar Saba F.C. players
Beitar Netanya F.C. players
Beitar Jerusalem F.C. players
Sektzia Ness Ziona F.C. players
Beitar Nes Tubruk F.C. players
1956 AFC Asian Cup players
Footballers at the 1958 Asian Games
1960 AFC Asian Cup players
Footballers from Tel Aviv
Association football forwards
Asian Games competitors for Israel
Burials at Yarkon Cemetery
Israeli Football Hall of Fame inductees